"My Melody of Love" is the title of a popular song from 1974 (see 1974 in music) by the American singer Bobby Vinton. Vinton adapted his song from a German schlager song composed by Henry Mayer, and it appears on Vinton's album Melodies of Love.

Vinton came up with the idea to adapt Mayer's song while performing in Las Vegas, Nevada. The original song was called  ("Hearts have no windows") and was a hit in Germany and Austria as performed by Austrian singer Elfi Graf. A version with newly written English lyrics, released as a single called "Don't Stay Away Too Long" by the British duo Peters and Lee earlier in 1974, failed to chart in the US but reached number three on the UK Singles Chart.  Vinton's lyrics use a refrain that switches between English and Polish:

 
Means that I love you so. 
 
More than you'll ever know. 
 
Love you with all my heart.

"My Melody of Love" was Vinton's highest charting US pop hit since "Mr. Lonely" reached number one on the Billboard Hot 100 chart in 1964, nearly ten years before.  The RIAA-certified gold single spent two weeks at number three on the Hot 100 chart in November 1974 and one week at number one on the Billboard easy listening chart, the singer's fourth song to top this chart.  Its success led to Vinton's nickname "the Polish Prince".  The song also became the theme-song of The Bobby Vinton Show, Vinton's variety show which ran in Canada on the CTV Network from 1975 to 1978. The song was also performed numerous times on the Lawrence Welk Show during the mid- to late-1970s.

Charts

Weekly charts

Year-end charts

See also
List of number-one adult contemporary singles of 1974 (U.S.)

References

External links
Single release info at discogs.com
 

1974 singles
Bobby Vinton songs
RPM Top Singles number-one singles
Songs written by Bobby Vinton
Pop ballads
1974 songs
ABC Records singles
Songs with music by Heinz Meier (composer)